The Great British Teddy Bear Company (founded 2002) is a British plush toy company owned by three generations of the Jessup family.

History 
In 2007, Bobby the first official Metropolitan Police Teddy bear was launched at Hamleys in London, the launch was attended by Prime Minister Gordon Brown and celebrities Shane Richie, Lisa Maxwell and the cast of ITV drama The BILL.

It has created teddy bears for Britain’s most famous institutions, museums and visitor attractions, these include the official teddy bear: Sherlock for The Sherlock Holmes Museum, Beefeater for the Tower of London, official bear for the Ministry of Defence; Army, Royal Navy and Royal Airforce.
 
In 2015, The Great British Teddy Bear Company was protected by both copyright and trademark in China, India, Japan and South Korea. GB Teddy Bears are now used under license on a broad range of products including clothing, mobile games and visitor attraction by companies including Bestseller Fashion, Tencent Games, PUBG Mobile, and PolyGroup Holdings.

References

External links 

 Official website

Toy companies of the United Kingdom
Doll manufacturing companies
British companies established in 2002
Toy companies established in 2002